Erica Lennard (born 1950) is an American photographer. Her work is included in the collections of the Smithsonian American Art Museum, the Davison Art Center at Wesleyan University and the Centre Pompidou, Paris.

References

Living people
1950 births
20th-century American photographers
21st-century American photographers
20th-century American women artists
21st-century American women artists
Artists in the Smithsonian American Art Museum collection